Clavatula xanteni is a species of sea snail, a marine gastropod mollusk in the family Clavatulidae.

Description

Distribution
This species occurs off the mouth of the Congo river and in North Angola.

References

External links
 MNHN, Paris: Clavatula xanteni

xanteni